This list of the prehistoric life of Hawaii contains the various prehistoric life-forms whose fossilized remains have been reported from within the US state of Hawaii.

Precambrian-Mesozoic
Since the oldest of the Hawaiian islands is a little more than 5 million years old, the Paleobiology Database records no known occurrences of Precambrian, Paleozoic, or Mesozoic fossils in Hawaii.

Cenozoic
This list of the Cenozoic life of Hawaii contains the various prehistoric life-forms whose fossilized remains have been reported from within the US state of Hawaii and are between 66 million and 10,000 years of age.

A

 Acar
 †Acar plicata
 Acropora
  †Acropora cerealis – tentative report
 Acrosterigma
 †Acrosterigma orbita
 Amphisorus
 Amphistegina
 †Amphistegina lessonii
 †Aplodon
 †Aplodon tectus
  †Apteribis
 †Apteribis glenos
 Arca
 †Arca ventricosa
 †Arca vetula
 Astrea
 †Astrea curta – or unidentified comparable form

B

  Barbatia
 †Barbatia hawaia
 †Barbatia hendersoni
 †Barbatia oahua
 †Barbatia tenella
 Bostrycapulus
 †Bostrycapulus gravispinosa
 Brachidontes
 †Brachidontes crebristriatus
 Branta
 †Branta hylobadistes – or unidentified related form
 Bulla
 †Bulla peasei
 Bursa
 †Bursa bufonia
  †Bursa corrugata

C

 Calcarina – or unidentified comparable form
 Calliotrochus
 †Calliotrochus marmoreus
  †Canarium
 †Canarium maculatus
 †Canarium mutabilis
 Cancilla
 †Cancilla granatina
 Carcharodon
 Casmaria
 †Casmaria cernica
 †Casmaria erinaceus
 †Casmaria ponderosa
 Cellana
 †Cellana argentata
  †Cellana exarata
 †Cellana melanostoma
 Cerithiopsis
 †Cerithiopsis radicula
 Cerithium
 †Cerithium columna
  †Cerithium echinatum
 †Cerithium interstria
 †Cerithium mutatum
  †Chaetoptila
 Chama
 †Chama limbula
 Charonia
 †Charonia triton
 Cheilea
 †Cheilea cicatricosa
 †Cheilea dillwyni
 Chlamys
 †Chlamys cookei
 †Chlamys hawaiensis
 Circus
 †Circus dossenus – type locality for species
  †Ciridops
 Clava
 †Clava atromarginatum
 †Clava nesioticus
 Clypeomorus
 †Clypeomorus graniferum
 †Clypeomorus obeliscus
 Codakia
 †Codakia thaanumi
 Columbella
 †Columbella varians
 Conus
 †Conus abbreviatus
 †Conus aulicus
 †Conus catus
 †Conus chaldaeus
  †Conus ebraeus
 †Conus flavidus
  †Conus geographus
 †Conus granifer – or unidentified comparable form
 †Conus imperialis
 †Conus kahiko – type locality for species
 †Conus litoglyphus
 †Conus lividus
 †Conus moreleti – or unidentified comparable form
 †Conus nanus
 †Conus nussatella
 †Conus obscura
 †Conus planorbis
 †Conus plicarius
 †Conus praelatus
 †Conus pulicarius
 †Conus rattus
 †Conus retifer
 †Conus sponsalis
 †Conus striatus
 †Conus tulipa
 †Conus vexillum
 Coralliobia
 †Coralliobia fimbriatus
 Coralliophila
 †Coralliophila madreporarum
 †Coralliophila violacea
 Corvus
 Cribrarula
 †Cribrarula gaskoini
 Ctena
 †Ctena bella
 Cycloseris
 Cymatium
 †Cymatium gemmatum
 †Cymatium mundum
 Cyphastrea
 †Cyphastrea ocellina
  Cypraea

D

 Daphnella
 †Daphnella ornata
 Dendropoma
 †Dendropoma maximus
 Diodora
 †Diodora granifera
  †Dolicholatirus
 †Dolicholatirus acus
 Drupa
 †Drupa albolabris
 †Drupa morum
 †Drupa ricina
 †Drupa rubusidaeus

E

 Erosaria
  †Erosaria caputserpentis
 †Erosaria erosa
 †Erosaria helvola
 †Erosaria labrolineata
 †Erosaria poraria

F

 Favia
  Favites
 †Favites chinensis – or unidentified comparable form
 Flabellipecten
 †Flabellipecten stearnsii
 Fungia
 †Fungia scutaria
 Fusinus

G

  †Galaxea
 †Galaxea haligena – or unidentified comparable form
 Gardineroseris
 †Gardineroseris planulata
  Gastrochaena
 †Gastrochaena hawaiensis
 Globulina
 †Grallistrix
 †Grallistrix geleches – type locality for species
 †Grallistrix orion – type locality for species
 Gutturinium
 †Gutturinium muricinum
 Gypsina

H

  Haliaeetus
 †Halimeda
 Haminoea
 †Haminoea curta
 Harpa
  †Harpa amouretta
 †Harpa armouret – or unidentified comparable form
 Hastula
 †Hastula confusa
 †Hastula mera
 †Hastula verreauxi
 Heliacus
 †Heliacus variegata
  Heterocentrotus
 †Heterocentrotus mammillatus
 Heterostegina
 Hipponix
 †Hipponix foliacea
 †Hipponix pilosa
 Hydrolithon
 †Hydrolithon munitum
 †Hydrolithon onkodes
 †Hydrolithon rupestre

I

 Isognomon
 †Isognomon marspiallis

L

  Lamna
 Leptastrea
 †Leptastrea purpurea
 Leptoseris
 †Leptoseris hawaiiensis
  Linatella
 †Linatella succinta – or unidentified comparable form
 Liocerithium
 †Liocerithium thaanumi
 †Litharium
 †Litharium oceanida
 Lithophaga
 †Lithophaga hawaia
  Lithophyllum
 †Lithophyllum acrocamptum
 †Lithophyllum incrassatum
 †Lithophyllum insipidum
 †Lithophyllum pustulatum
 †Lithoporella
 †Lithoporella melobesiodes
 Lithothamnion
 †Lithothamnion muelleri
 †Lithothamnion prolifer
 †Lithothamnion pulchrum
 Littoraria
 †Littoraria pintado
 Luria
 †Luria isabella
 †Luria tessellata
 Lyncina
 †Lyncina carneola
 †Lyncina leviathan
 †Lyncina schilderorum
  †Lyncina vitellus

M

 Mauritia
 †Mauritia maculifera
 †Mauritia mauritiana
 †Mauritia scurra
  Mesophyllum
 †Micromelo
 †Micromelo guamensis
 †Miripecten
 †Miripecten amaliae – or unidentified comparable form
 Mitra
 †Mitra ambigua
 †Mitra assimilis
 †Mitra astricta
 †Mitra brunnea
 †Mitra chrysalis
 †Mitra crassa
 †Mitra fulvescens
 †Mitra limbifera
 †Mitra litterata
 †Mitra lutea
 †Mitra mitra
 †Mitra pellisserpentis
  †Mitra stictica
  †Mitra tabanula
 Monoplex
 †Monoplex nicobaricus
 †Monoplex pilearis
  Montipora
 †Montipora hispida
 Morula
 †Morulina
 †Morulina chrysostoma
 †Morulina morus
 †Morulina ochrostoma

N

 Nassa
 †Nassa francolinus
  Nassarius
 †Nassarius crematus
 †Nassarius hirtus
 †Nassarius pauperus
 †Nassarius pictus
 Natica
 †Natica lurida
 †Neogoniolithon
 †Neogoniolithon fosliei
 Nerita
 †Nerita neglecta
 †Nerita picea
 Neritina
 †Neritina turrita
 Numenius
  †Numenius tahitiensis

O

 Oliva
 †Oliva sandwicensis
  Ostrea
 †Ostrea kamehameha
 †Ostrea retusa
 †Ostrea sandvichensis
 †Ostrea thaanumi
 †Oxyrhina

P

 Pavona
  †Pavona duerdeni
 †Pavona varians
 Peneroplis
 Periglypta
 †Periglypta reticulata
 Peristernia
 †Peristernia chlorostoma
  Peyssonnelia
 †Phaeornis
 †Phaeornis obscurus
 Pinctada
 †Pinctada margaritifera
 Pisania
 †Pisania ignea
 †Pisania marmorata
 †Planorbinella
 Platygyra
 Plesiotrochus
 †Plesiotrochus exilis
 Pocillopora
 †Pocillopora damicornis
 †Pocillopora eydouxi
 †Pocillopora ligulata
 †Pocillopora molekensis
  †Pocillopora verrucosa
 Polinices
 †Polinices opaca
 Porites
 †Porites compressa
 †Porites lobata
 †Porolithon
 †Porolithon gardineri
  Porzana
 †Porzana ralphorum – type locality for species
 †Porzana ziegleri – type locality for species
 Proterato
 †Proterato sandwichensis
 Psammocora
  Pterodroma
 †Pterodroma hypoleuca
 †Pterodroma jugabilis – type locality for species
 †Pterodroma phaeopygia
 Purpura
 †Purpura intermedia
 †Purpuradusta
 †Purpuradusta fimbriata
 Pustularia
 †Pustularia cicercula
 Pyrene
 †Pyrene moleculina

Q

 Quidnipagus
 †Quidnipagus palatum
 Quinqueloculina

R

 Rhinoclavis
 †Rhinoclavis articulata
 Rissoina
  †Rissoina ambigua
 †Rissoina triticea

S

 †Scutarcopagia
 †Scutarcopagia scobinata
 Semele
 †Semele tita
 Septifer
 †Septifer excisus
 Seriatopora
  †Seriatopora hystrix – or unidentified comparable form
 Spondylus
 †Spondylus mimus
 †Spongites
 †Sporolithon
 †Sporolithon episoredion
 †Sporolithon molle
 †Sporolithon ptychoides
  Staphylaea
 †Staphylaea granulata
 Stilifer
 †Stilifer speciosa
 Strombus
 †Strombus aurisdianae
 †Strombus chiragra
 †Strombus erythrinus
 †Strombus gibberulus
 †Strombus helli
 †Strombus oostergaardi
 Stylophora
 †Stylophora gemmans
  †Stylophora pistillata

T

 Talostolida
  †Talostolida teres
 Talparia
  †Talparia talpa
 Tellina
 †Tellina dispar
  Terebra
 †Terebra affinis
 †Terebra babylon – or unidentified comparable form
 †Terebra cerithina
 †Terebra chlorata
 †Terebra colume – or unidentified comparable form
 †Terebra crenulata
 †Terebra felina
 †Terebra flavescens
 †Terebra funiculata
 †Terebra gouldi
 †Terebra kilburnii
 †Terebra maculata
 †Terebra nodularis
 †Terebra peasei
 †Terebra undulata
 Textularia
 †Thambetochen
  †Thambetochen chauliodous
  †Thambetochen xanion – type locality for species
 †Titanoderma
 †Titanoderma prototypum
 Tonna
 †Tonna perdix
 Trapezium
 †Trapezium oblongum
 †Tridentarius
 †Tridentarius dentatus
 Triphora
 †Triphora cingulifera
 †Tritonoturris
 †Tritonoturris cumingii
 Trivirostra
 †Trivirostra hordacea
 †Trivirostra pellucidula
 Trochus
 †Trochus sandwichensis
 Turbo
 †Turbo intercostalis
 †Turbo sandwicensis
 †Turbo setosus
 †Turridrupa
 †Turridrupa astricta
 Turris
 †Turris amicta
 Tutufa
 †Tutufa bubo

V

 Vanikoro
 †Vanikoro semiplicata
  Vermetus
 Vexillum
 †Vexillum approxima
 †Vexillum aureolata
 †Vexillum bellum
 †Vexillum consanguinea
 †Vexillum nodosa
 †Vexillum semifasciata
 Vitularia
 †Vitularia miliaris
 †Vitularia sandwichensis

X

 Xenoturris
 †Xenoturris gemmuloides – or unidentified comparable form

Z

  Zebina
 †Zebina affinis

References

 

Hawaii
Hawaii-related lists